Cocoa Beach is a city in Brevard County, Florida, United States. The population was 11,539 at the 2018 United States Census. It is part of the Palm Bay–Melbourne–Titusville, Florida Metropolitan Statistical Area.

History
The first non-native settlement in the area was by a family of freed slaves following the American Civil War. In 1888, a group of men from Cocoa bought the entire tract of land, which went undeveloped until it was bought out in 1923 by a member of the group—Gus Edwards, Cocoa's city attorney. He stopped practicing law to devote all his efforts to developing the area.

Prior to incorporation, the area was known as Oceanus. The Town of Cocoa Beach was established on June 5, 1925. Cocoa Beach's first official meeting was held at the Cocoa Beach Casino on July 27, 1925, and adopted the City Seal. Gus C. Edwards was elected  as mayor and served as a commissioner along with J.A. Haisten, and R.Z. Grabel. A little less than a month later, plans for a pier became official.

In 1935, the FDOT opened up what is now State Road A1A as a one-lane dirt road to Eau Gallie. In 1938, a Deputy Marshal was appointed "to act in emergencies at night or at other times" for $.25/hour. By 1939, the town had 49 residents. In 1940, the town requested that State Road 140 (now A1A) be routed on Orlando Avenue instead of Atlantic Avenue. In 1942, the town prepared to receive men assigned to the newly opened Naval Air Station Banana River. Establishing regular garbage collection was discussed when the town discovered that the Air Station was having theirs collected.

On May 1, 1942, the German submarine  torpedoed the La Paz off the shore of Cocoa Beach. The crew was able to beach it with the help of tugs. Eventually it was returned to shipping. On May 3, the same U-boat sank the SS Laertes near the same spot. Local boys were recruited for salvaging efforts and to rid the beach of subsequent debris. Shortly thereafter, the federal government realized the danger of back-lighting from the coast making easy targets of passing ships and ordered a blackout for the remainder of the war.

During World War II, Cocoa Beach experienced money shortages to pay employees or to fix roads. In 1944, the town successfully fought a bill introduced in the Florida legislature which would have dissolved the city government. In 1947 a single police officer was hired for $1/hour. The same year, the city constructed works for the distribution of potable water. In 1950, a volunteer fire department was created which used a second-hand vehicle. In 1950, a proposal to prevent people from driving on the beach was defeated. In 1951, the city sought to place a stoplight, the city's first, at the intersection of what is now A1A and Minutemen Causeway. In 1953, the city decided to mark the names of all streets. That same year, the city planned to pave A1A south from 520 down Orlando Avenue. The city intended to bear 1/3 of the costs, the adjacent property owners, 2/3.

In 1954, the Women's Club opened a library in the building used by the Fire Department. In 1955, the city prepared to house the people who were going to be launching missiles from what is now Cape Canaveral Air Force Station.

In 1956, the city attorney warned the council that blacks might attempt to use the beach. If they did, he recommended clearing the beach of all persons, both white and black. The 1954 decision, Brown v. Board of Education, had, in theory at least, integrated all general public facilities. Actual integration came later.

The city proposed selling the town dump to the school board for a junior high school, in order to keep students from being bused to Merritt Island.

On June 29, 1957, the town of Cocoa Beach incorporated into a city. It sold its water system to Cocoa, Florida and contracted with them to furnish water.

In September 1959, the city voted to add more sidewalks, improve the streets in residential areas as well as the main streets, and to pave more roads.

In 1961, Ron-Jon opened their first store locally.

In 1965, Cocoa Beach High School requested that Cocoa Avenue, the street that the school was located on, be renamed Minutemen Boulevard, in honor of the school's mascot, the Minuteman.

Cocoa Beach started its major growth during the 1960s. There was a 1000% population increase from 1950 to 1960, mainly as a result of the U.S. space program. Many people moved to Cocoa Beach due to jobs connected to the space program and in search of new opportunities.

After crewed space flights, the town held parades in honor of the astronauts.

After NASA's Apollo program came to an end, and before the Space Shuttle program was in full swing, the town's economy reflected the resulting layoffs. At one point, in 1975, unemployment was 14.3%. Many families lost their jobs or simply moved away. The housing market plummeted and some people unable to sell their homes simply abandoned them.

Cocoa Beach was the setting for the 1960s sitcom I Dream of Jeannie, although no episodes were actually filmed there, and star Barbara Eden only made two visits during the show's production—both in 1969, for publicity. Cocoa Beach High School was used as the school in the 2002 movie Race to Space.

The 2010 Nebula Awards were held in the city.

In 2016, the largest mansion in the city was destroyed by fire. It had been built on the beach by Al Neuharth in 1975. It contained  of living space, 11 bedrooms and 12 bathrooms. It was valued at several million dollars.

Geography

Bordering the city on the north is Cape Canaveral; on the south is Crescent Beach; on the east is the Atlantic Ocean ( of oceanfront); on the west is the Banana River.

Propelled by a powerful hurricane, the ocean pushed its way through the barrier islands centuries ago and formed the Thousand Islands in the Banana River.

There are a number of boating channels dredged in the area: the 0–99 Channel, the 100 Channel, the 200 Channel for houseboats, the 300 Channel, the 400 Channel near housing for private boats, the 500 Channel and the 600 Channel. Dredged material is placed on one of the Thousand Islands, but is now controlled.

Many of the homes in Cocoa Beach are built on dredged mud and sand from the Banana River.

Surrounding areas
 Merritt Island 
 Atlantic Ocean 
 Cape Canaveral 
 Crescent Beach

Climate
Cocoa Beach's has a humid subtropical climate Köppen climate classification of Cfa. This climate features hot and humid summers with frequent tropical downpours and daily thundershowers, and warm, dry, and sunny winters.

Government
Cocoa Beach is run by a Commission-Manager government, agreed to by its citizens in 1958. The City Commission acts as the legislative branch of the city government, guided by the provisions of the Charter of the City of Cocoa Beach. The City Commission enacts ordinances and resolutions that the City Manager administers as the appointed executive officer of the city government.

The city owns and runs the Cocoa Beach Country Club, a golf course on the Banana River.

In 2007, the city had a taxable real estate base of $2.09 billion.

In 2011, the city photographed more than 20,000 instances of vehicles running red lights by the use of automatic cameras. A total of 6,595 violations were prosecuted. In 2012, the police force consisted of 36 officers. In 2014, the city grossed $1.1 million for over 9.000 red light violations. Over 24,000 violations were captured on film. All could not be prosecuted for various reasons. The city netted over $249,000. The remainder went for licensing fees to the installing vendor; over half was remitted to the state. Cameras were sited at four locations on state road A1A, including the intersection with state road 520. Intersection crashes dropped from 88 in 2009 to 30 in 2014.

The City Commission is made up of five members, one of whom is the Mayor. Historically, the commissioners were elected at-large to three-year terms but with a successful referendum on the 2010 ballot to hold elections on even-numbered years, the terms were extended to four years.

Following an election, a Vice Mayor is then selected from the commission members at an organizational meeting. The Mayor presides over all meetings and performs duties as delegated by the City Commission. Seats affected by the 2010 referendum included Seat #1, Seat #4 and Seat #5. The November 6, 2012 election results were:

City Commission
Mayor/Commissioner, Seat #1 –  Robert C. Genaro jr (term expires 2022)
Commissioner, Seat #2 – Ed Martinez  (term expires 2020)
Commissioner, Seat #3 – Karalyn Woulas  (term expires 2020)
Commissioner, Seat #4 – Skip Williams (term expires 2018)
Vice Mayor/Commissioner, Seat #5 – Mike Miller (term expires 2018)

City Manager
The City Manager is appointed by the City Commission and is responsible for the city's day-to-day operations. The city's charter has established a separation of powers and responsibility between the Commission and the Manager; the elected commission establishes policy that the manager and staff carry out. The City Manager conducts day-to-day operations through four city departments: Administrative, Public Safety, Utilities, and Recreation. Charles Billias was the City Manager from 1998 until October 2012. Bob Majka was the City Manager from 2012 until 2015. Jim McKnight is the current city manager.

Crime Rate 
In 2016, the crime index for the Cocoa Beach is 14 in 100. Where 100 is safest and 0 is most unsafe. Cocoa beach is safer than 14% of cities in the United States. The crime rate of Cocoa Beach is higher than Florida where chances of becoming a victim is 1 in 264, while in Cocoa Beach it is 1 in 183 people. Below is the chart for the crime rate of violent nature in Cocoa beach. It is important to note that this is a single year and may not represent the municipality as a whole, over a broader period of time.

Demographics

As of the census of 2010, there were 11,231 people, while estimated population as per 2017 is 11733 6,529 households, and 3,532 families residing in the city. The population density was 2,552.1 inhabitants per square mile (985.5 per km2). There were 8,709 housing units at an average density of 1,780.6 per square mile (687.6 per km2). The racial makeup of the city was 96.64% White, 0.62% Black, 0.22% Native American, 1.07% Asian, 0.06% Pacific Islander, 0.30% from other races, and 1.08% from two or more races. Hispanic or Latino of any race were 2.52% of the population.

There were 6,529 households, 12.9% of which had children under the age of 18 residing; 45.5% were married couples living together; 5.8% had a female householder with no husband present, and 45.9% were non-families. 38.3% of all households were made up of individuals, and 18.7% were households of persons 65 years of age or older living alone. The average household size was 1.91 and the average family size was 2.47.

The city's population was divided into the following age groups: 12.2% under the age of 18; 3.8% between 18 and 24; 22.0% between 25 and 44,; 27.6% between 45 and 64, and 34.4% who were 65 years of age or older. The median age was 54 years. For every 100 females, there were 99.3 males. For every 100 females aged 18 years and older, there were 96.4 males.

Cocoa Beach is a retirement area, with an average age of 56.5.

Economy

Personal income
According to the census, the median income for a single household in the city was $42,372, and the median income for a family was $51,795. Males had a median income of $39,418 versus $27,113 for females. The per capita income for the city was $28,968. About 3.7% of families and 6.5% of the population were below the poverty line, including 9.8% of those under age 18 and 4.0% of those age 65 or over.

Tourism

Ron Jon's, a surf shop, receives 2 million visitors a year. Cocoa Beach is home to the East Coast Surfing Hall of Fame.

The Cocoa Beach Pier, formerly known as the Cape Canaveral Pier, was built in 1962. An annual Easter Surfing Festival began in 1964. An estimated 100,000 spectators attend annually.

An air show in 2009 drew a crowd estimated at 30,000.

The Ron Jon Easter Surfing Festival drew 50,000 visitors in 2009, while around 10,000 visitors attend the Surfing Santas festival each year at Christmas.

The largest charity surfing festival, National Kidney Foundation Pro-Am Surfing Festival, has been held every Labor Day Weekend in Cocoa Beach since 1985.

In 2015 businesses in the city collected $5.6 million in tourist tax, over half the tourist tax collected in the county and more than any other municipality, $1.4 million.

Workforce
In 2007, Cocoa Beach's median labor force was 6,344. Of that group, 6,006 were employed and 338 were unemployed, for an unemployment rate of 5.3%.

The median home price in 2007 was $409,000.

Health 
The disability rate for the people under age of 65 is 7.6%. The number of people who do not have insurance policies on the Cocoa beach is 20.8%.

Language 
The primary language spoken in Cocoa Beach is English, with 9.8% of the population speaking languages other than English at home.

Travel time to work 
Mean travel time to the work is 25.4 minutes from home to work.

Education
The city has three public schools:
Freedom 7 Elementary
Theodore Roosevelt Elementary
Cocoa Beach High School

Freedom 7 Elementary school and Cocoa Beach Jr./Sr High School both are certified International Baccalaureate schools. Freedom 7 Elementary has a primary years program, and Cocoa Beach Jr./Sr High has both a middle years program and a diploma program.

96.1% of all residents 25 years or older are high school graduates. 42.3% have a Bachelor's Degree or higher.

Landmarks
 
Cocoa Beach Pier
Alan Shepard Beachfront Park
Thousand Islands Conservation Area
Cocoa Beach Aquatic Center and Pool Complex
I Dream of Jeannie Lane

Former
Cocoa Beach Glass Bank

Infrastructure

Roads
The following roads are usually called by their numbers when spoken:
  SR A1A – This is the main road through the city. From north to south, SR A1A enters Cocoa Beach from Cape Canaveral as Atlantic Avenue. After passing the downtown area and resort area, the road splits into a one-way pair of roads, southbound being named Orlando Avenue, with northbound keeping the name Atlantic Avenue. The route continues in this manner until the southbound town limits. Major intersections include SR 520, 4th Street, and Minutemen Causeway.
  SR 520 – This is the main way to access the city from the mainland. It enters the city from the unincorporated community of Merritt Island, and the route terminates at SR A1A. Major intersections include the Cape Canaveral Hospital entrance, Banana River Boulevard, and SR A1A.
It is estimated that there are 2.4 million day trippers to the city annually. While businesses appreciate the tourism, it creates a parking problem for the city. There are 1,780 paved parking spaces and 607 spaces on the streets downtown, near the beach.

Public transportation
Public transportation in Cocoa Beach, Cape Canaveral, and surrounding Brevard County is provided by Space Coast Area Transit.

Utilities
The city contracted directly with Florida Power & Light for electricity, paying 10.689 cents per kilowatt hour in 2010.

Canals
The city has 37 canals, totaling , serving residential homes, plus  of channels. These are maintained by the city.

Notable people

 Kim Adler, professional bowler and USBC Hall of Famer, 5th Street
 Allison Anders, raised in the city. Filmed Things Behind the Sun in the county in 2001
 Emanne Beasha, singer
 Willam Belli, a drag queen, actor, recording artist, and YouTuber raised in the city
 Dana Brown, iconic surfing legend, 16th Street
 Cullen Douglas, television and movie actor, director, screenwriter
 James Folston professional football player for the Oakland Raiders #55
 Ashlyn Harris, professional soccer player
 Jay F. Honeycutt, former director of the Kennedy Space Center
 Zora Neale Hurston, author
 Rick Martel, former professional wrestler
 Bubba McDowell, professional football player with the Houston Oilers #25
 Allen Neuharth, CEO of Gannett and columnist. Founder of USA Today
 Kelly Slater, professional surfer, 11-time World Champion
 George Steele, professional wrestler a.k.a. George "The Animal" Steele
 Carrot Top, comedian, actor, was born in the city
 Lori Wilson, Florida state legislator and lawyer
 Melissa Witek, Miss Florida USA 2005 and contestant on NBC's Treasure Hunters
 Nancy Yasecko, filmmaker and videographer

See also
 Harbor Cay Condominium, which collapsed while under construction in 1981
 Space Chase USA (2019 film documentary)

References

External links

 
 

 
1925 establishments in Florida
Beaches of Brevard County, Florida
Beaches of Florida
Cities in Brevard County, Florida
Cities in Florida
Populated coastal places in Florida on the Atlantic Ocean
Populated places established in 1925